Howard I Maibach is an American dermatologist, professor of Dermatology at the University of California, San Francisco (UCSF).
His major contributions include seminal work in wound management,
and extensive work in patient care, dermatophysiology, dermatophamacology, and dermatotoxicology.
In 2013, he was awarded the "Master Dermatologist Award" by the American Academy of Dermatology for his outstanding contributions to the practice and teaching of Dermatology.

Biography 
 
Maibach was born on 18 July 1929, in New York, NY. He graduated from Tulane University School of Medicine   in 1955, and   completed his internship from William Beaumont Army Hospital, El Paso, TX in 1956. He later completed his Fellowship from Hospital of the University of Pennsylvania in 1961. He also practiced neuropsychiatry for few months in 1956.

Professional work
He is a specialist in contact and occupational dermatitis,  including the toxicological    and pharmacological aspects. . He is also known for his work in neonatal skin, dose response of topical drugs and per-cutaneous penetration.

He has written over 3,000 research articles, which according to an estimate could be a world record.

Controversy 
In December 2022, UCSF released the results of a preliminary investigation into his research conducted on prisoners at the California Medical Facility at Vacaville. The report raised ethical concerns over how the research was conducted, especially with regards to getting informed consent from and communicating research risks to participants, and the fact that many of the prisoners were being assessed or treated for psychiatric conditions. The report noted that the experiments did not involve treating medical conditions the patients had, in some cases involved exposing patients to herbicides and insecticides.
In his response to the report, Maibach expressed remorse regarding his involvement in the research, stating "[While] the work I did with colleagues at CMF was considered by many to be appropriate by the standards of the day, [in retrospect] those standards were clearly evolving. I obviously would not work under those circumstances today... I have sincere remorse in relationship to these efforts some decades ago."
The University of California at San Francisco issued an apology for its role in supporting the research.

Honors   
Maibach was awarded an honorary PhD by Universite de Paris-Sud in 1985 and Université Claude Bernard, Lyon in 2008. In 2013, he was awarded the "Master Dermatologist Award" by the American Academy of Dermatology.

References

Shohreh Nafisi, Howard I Maibach, Skin penetration of nanoparticles, 
Emerging nanotechnologies in immunology, Elsevier, 2018, 47-88.

Shohreh Nafisi,  Howard I Maibach, Cosmetic science and technology: theoretical principles and applications,Elsevier, 2017, 337.

American dermatologists
Living people
Year of birth missing (living people)